Haile Debas (born 1937, Asmara) is an Eritrean physician and academic administrator at the University of California, San Francisco.

Life
Haile T. Debas was born in Asmara, Eritrea, in 1937. Following undergraduate training at University College of Addis Ababa, he received his M.D. from McGill University in 1963, and completed his surgical training at the University of British Columbia. His postgraduate training included a year as a research fellow at the University of Glasgow/Western Infirmary in Scotland, and two years at UCLA as a Medical Research Council Scholar in gastrointestinal physiology.

After a year in private practice in the Yukon Territories and British Columbia, he joined the surgery faculty of the University of British Columbia in 1970. He remained there until 1980, and then served on the faculty of UCLA (1980-1985) and the University of Washington (1985-1987).

In 1987, Debas came to UCSF as chair of the Department of Surgery. During his tenure, UCSF became one of the country's leading centers for transplant surgery, the training of young surgeons, and basic and clinical research in surgery. Debas achieved national recognition as a gastrointestinal investigator and made original contributions to the physiology, biochemistry, and pathophysiology of gastrointestinal peptide hormones.

Debas served as Dean of the UCSF School of Medicine from 1993-2003. Under his leadership, the School became a national model for medical education, an achievement for which he was recognized with the 2004 Abraham Flexner Award of the AAMC. Major initiatives included the formation of several interdepartmental and interdisciplinary centers of excellence, the development of the UCSF AIDS Research Institute, a redesign of the UCSF Human Genetics Program, and important changes in the medical school curriculum.

In 1997, Haile T. Debas was appointed the seventh Chancellor of UCSF, agreeing to accept the appointment for a period of one year. Serving concurrently as both Chancellor and School of Medicine Dean, he played a key role in all of the major initiatives of the campus, including the development of UCSF Stanford Health Care, the campus at Mission Bay, and the UCSF Comprehensive Cancer Center.

Debas was founding Executive Director of UCSF Global Health Sciences (GHS) since its establishment in 2003 until the appointment of Jaime Sepulveda in 2011. GHS integrates UCSF expertise in the health, social, and biological sciences to focus on issues such as the global impact of diseases of poverty, chronic illness, and the worldwide threats of infectious diseases.  Debas was named Global Health Advisor to UCSF in 2011 by Chancellor Susan Desmond-Hellmann, and now works in that capacity.

Debas has held leadership positions with numerous membership organizations and professional associations. He is a fellow of the American Academy of Arts and Sciences and a member of the Institute of Medicine. He currently serves on the United Nations Commission on HIV/AIDS and Governance in Africa and on the Committee on Science, Engineering, and Public Policy of the National Academy of Sciences.

References

External links
 Haile T. Debas, MD, Executive Director, Global Health Sciences
Haile Debas's Short Talk: "Rebuilding African Universities"

1937 births
Living people
Eritrean surgeons
McGill University Faculty of Medicine alumni
University of British Columbia alumni
University of California, San Francisco faculty
American people of Eritrean descent
Members of the National Academy of Medicine